Maurice Connor may refer to:

Joe Connor (footballer, born 1877) (Maurice Joseph John Connor, 1877–1934), Irish association football player
Maurice Connor (American football) (died 1939), American football coach

Other people
Maurice Conner (1868–1937), sometimes spelled as Connor, Canadian politician